Safe Is Just a Shadow is the second studio album by heavy metal band Ice Nine Kills. The album was originally released on July 12, 2010 but was re-recorded and released in 2017, packaged as Safe Is Just a Shadow (Re-Shadowed and Re-Recorded).

Background
The album was re-released after being re-recorded on January 6, 2017. Vocalist Spencer Charnas described the reasoning, stating "With the evolution of our skills as musicians, and the original producer, Steve Sopchak, having established himself at the top of his craft, we felt this was a perfect time to re-record the album and give it that extra attention that it always deserved. We’ve also repackaged the album with the impressive Toby Fraser produced artwork that was originally supposed to accompany the release".

Track listing
Original recording:

Personnel 
2010 issue:
 Spencer Charnas – vocals, keyboards
 Dave Sieling – vocals
 Justin "JD" DeBlieck – guitar, keyboards, vocals, sound design, production
 Shane Bisnett – bass, vocals
 Justin Morrow – guitar
 Connor Sullivan – drums

2017 re-recording:
 Spencer Charnas – vocals, keyboards
 Justin "JD" DeBlieck – guitar, keyboards, programming, vocals, sound design, production
 Justin Morrow – bass, guitar
 Connor Sullivan – drums

Charts

2017 version

References

2010 albums
Ice Nine Kills albums
Fearless Records albums